This is a list of commemorative postage stamps issued by the India Post between 1991 and 2000.

1991

1992

1993

1994

1995

1996

1997

1998

1999

2000

References

External links
 Catalogue of Indian Postage Stamps

Postage stamps of India
India